Avaete, Seed of Revenge is a 1985 Brazilian drama film directed by Zelito Viana. Based on the massacre of Cinta Larga people in the region of Fontanillas (now Juína, Mato Grosso), it was shot along the Juruena River, Mato Grosso, as well as on locations in São Paulo and Brasília. It was entered into the 14th Moscow International Film Festival where it won the Silver Prize.

Cast
 Hugo Carvana
 Renata Sorrah
 Milton Rodrigues
 Macsuara Kadiweu
 José Dumont
 Cláudio Mamberti
 Sérgio Mamberti
 Cláudio Marzo
 Nina de Pádua
 Jonas Bloch
 Chico Diaz
 Marcos Palmeira

References

External links
 

1985 films
1985 drama films
Brazilian drama films
Drama films based on actual events
Films shot in Brasília
Films shot in Mato Grosso
Films shot in São Paulo
Best Picture APCA Award winners
1980s Portuguese-language films